Francis Henry "Jumbo Jack" Gardner (August 14, 1903 – November 26, 1957) was an American jazz pianist.

Career 
Gardner played locally in Denver in the early-1920s, including with Doc Becker's Blue Devils and Boyd Senter's band. He moved to Chicago in 1923, where he led his own band in addition to playing with musicians like Wingy Manone, Jean Goldkette,  and Gene Austin. He remained in Chicago through 1937, playing with Jimmy McPartland in 1936. Moving to New York City, he began associations with Sandy Williams's orchestra and Harry James, but returned to Chicago early in the 1940s, where he led his own group. In 1944, he recorded with Baby Dodds. He spent much of his later life playing in Dallas, Texas, where he died in 1957.

Gardner's compositions include the song "Bye, Bye, Pretty Baby," co-written with George Hamilton.

References 
Footnotes

General references
"Jack Gardner". The New Grove Dictionary of Jazz online.
John Chilton, Who's Who of Jazz.

1903 births
1957 deaths
American jazz pianists
American male pianists
Jazz musicians from Illinois
20th-century American pianists
20th-century American male musicians
American male jazz musicians